Beverly Grier is an American academic in the study of child labor Sub-Saharan Africa, and former professor of government at Clark University. She is also the former president of the African Studies Association. She currently serves as Interim Associate Dean for Curriculum & Student Affairs at North Carolina A&T State University.

Publications
Grier's most recent book is Invisible Hands: Child Labor and the State in Colonial Zimbabwe (Heinemann, 2005).

She has published many other articles and books on Africa, including "Women in West Africa" in the Women's Studies Encyclopedia, Making Sense of Our Differences: African American Women on Anita Hill, Wayne State University Press, Pawns, Porters and Petty Traders: Women in the Transition to Export Agriculture in Ghana, Westview Press, Politics in Niger, Oxford University Press, Contradiction, Crisis and Class Conflict: The State and Capitalist Development in Ghana Prior to 1948, Oxford University Press, "Underdevelopment, Modes of Production and the State in Colonial Ghana", African Studies Review, and "Cocoa Marketing in Colonial Ghana: Capitalist Enterprise and the Emergence of a Rural African Bourgeoisie", 1980–1981.

References

External links
 North Carolina A&T State University North Carolina A&T State University

Clark University faculty
Year of birth missing (living people)
Living people
American Africanists
African-American social scientists
North Carolina A&T State University faculty
Yale University alumni
African-American women writers
American women writers
African-American writers
American women political scientists
American political scientists
African-American women academics
American women academics
African-American academics
21st-century African-American people
21st-century African-American women
Presidents of the African Studies Association